Rogelj is a Slovene surname. Notable people with the surname include:

 Bine Rogelj (born 1929), Slovene ski jumper
 Joeri Rogelj (born 1980), Belgian climatologist
 Rok Rogelj (born 1987), Slovene snowboarder
 Špela Rogelj (born 1994), Slovene ski jumper
 Žan Rogelj (born 1999), Slovene footballer

See also
 
 Rogel

Slovene-language surnames